"Sweet Soul Music" is a single by the Europop duo London Boys which also featured Soul Kitchen. The single was written and produced by Ralf René Maué, and was the first since the duo's rise to fame not to be released in the UK.

The single had a promotional music video created to support the track. This became the last promo video for the duo although there was a video for 1995 single "Gospel Train to London" which was released under the name The New London Boys, despite being the same duo.

Formats
7" Single
"Sweet Soul Music" - 3:29
"Sweet Soul Music (Instrumental)" - 3:33

12" Single
"Sweet Soul Music (Soul Kitchen Mix)" - 7:15
"Sweet Soul Music (Radio Mix)" - 3:29
"Sweet Soul Music (Instrumental)" - 3:33

CD Single
"Sweet Soul Music (Soul Kitchen Mix)" - 7:15
"Sweet Soul Music (Radio Mix)" - 3:29
"Sweet Soul Music (Instrumental)" - 3:33

CD Single (Japan release)
"Sweet Soul Music (Soul Kitchen Mix)" - 7:21
"Sweet Soul Music (Radio Mix)" - 3:35
"Sweet Soul Music (Instrumental)" - 3:40
"Freedom (Radio Version)" - 3:59
"Freedom (Eight-O-Eight Mix)" - 8:11
"Freedom (Instrumental)" - 3:53

Chart performance

Personnel 
 Edem Ephraim: Vocals
 Dennis Fuller: Choreographer, backing vocals
 Ralf René Maué: Writer, producer
 Soul Kitchen: Instruments

References

Songs about soul
1991 singles
London Boys songs
Songs written by Ralf René Maué
1991 songs
East West Records singles
Teldec singles